A list of animated feature films first released in 1986.

Highest-grossing animated films of the year

See also
 List of animated television series of 1986

References

 Feature films
1986
1986-related lists